Blyderivierpoort Dam is a gravity-arch dam on the Blyde River, in the lower Blyde River Canyon, near Hoedspruit in Mpumalanga, South Africa. It also floods the lower reaches of the Blyde's Ohrigstad River tributary. The dam was completed in 1974. The 71 m high dam wall and 22 m deep is situated 3 km from Swadini resort by road.

Purpose

Its key purpose is to provide a stable water supply for irrigators of the Blyde River Irrigation district and to provide additional water for mining and industry at Phalaborwa.

Irrigation district
Orchards and croplands were established along the lower Blyde in the latter half of the 20th century, with 23,521 ha devoted to irrigation in 1995.

Resettlement
During 1965 the community that lived at the site of the proposed dam was resettled (with compensation) by the government to nearby towns including Buffelshoek, Acornhoek, Beverleyshoek and Bushbuckridge. Some stone walled settlements, cultural artefacts and graves are now submerged under the dam.

See also
 List of reservoirs and dams in South Africa
 List of rivers of South Africa

References 
 List of South African Dams from the South African Department of Water Affairs

Dams in South Africa
Dams completed in 1974